The main components of the Coat of arms of Madrid (the bear and the tree) have their origin in the Middle Ages. The different coats of arms have experienced several modifications, losing for example motifs often displayed in early designs such as water and flint.

In 1822, the municipal council adopted a design that entailed the addition of a gryphon and civic crown, which were removed in 1967.

The shield is argent, a bear sable supported on a strawberry tree vert fructed gules; on a bordure azure seven stars argent. The shield is adorned with a large open royal crown of gold and precious stones, with eight rosettes (five visible) alternating with eight pearls; this crown is commonly used in Spanish heraldry for territorial and municipal arms.

The image of the bear and the strawberry tree is also a component of the badge of the football club Atlético Madrid.

History
According to chronicles, the militias of the council of Madrid carried a banner identified them in different battles of the early 13th century: a bear sable on a field argent.

In 1222, the fodder was determined to belong to the clergymen, whereas the forests would pertain to the council. The bear, which formerly had been displayed on all fours, began to stand on its hind legs leaning on a tree in council representations, possibly underpinning the control of timber by the council, whereas the cabildo's bear in cabildo emblems remained walking.

There are several hypothesis regarding the beginnings of the identification of the tree with a strawberry tree (Arbutus unedo), be it a Arbutus/Arbustus confusion the improbable abundance of the species in Madrid (unlike that of Celtis australis), or perhaps an attempt to improve on the gaudiness or the composition.

Gallery

See also

Coats of arms of the Community and historic province of Madrid
Spanish heraldry

References

External links

Enrique García Domingo, Recompensas republicanas por el hundimiento del Baleares, Revista de Historia Naval 1997, Año XV no. 59, page 70.

1212 establishments in Europe
Madrid
Culture in Madrid
History of Madrid
Madrid
Mardrid
Madrid
Madrid
13th-century establishments in Castile